Seyed Zia Hashemi (born 1968 in Yasuj) is an Iranian Doctorate, politician and former acting Minister of Science, a position he held from 20 August 2017 until 29 October 2017. He is also Vice President of Social and Cultural Affair at Ministry of Science, Research and Technology, a position he held since 2013. He is head of the Islamic Republic News Agency since 1 January 2018.

Life
Seyed Zia Hashemi was born and raised in Yasuj. He was from a traditional family and his father was a respected teacher. After graduation from high school, he moved to Tehran and started studying sociology at University of Tehran. After getting his PhD, he joined the Faculty of Social Sciences at University of Tehran and he is still teaching there.

References 

Iranian politicians
1968 births
Living people
Ministers of science of Iran
Faculty of Social Sciences of the University of Tehran alumni